Soil is a naturally occurring granular covering on the surface of Earth, capable of supporting life.

Soil may also refer to:
Lunar soil, a similar granular covering on the Moon (though without Earth soil's organic components)
Martian soil, the fine regolith found on the surface of Mars
Earth (wuxing), an element in Chinese philosophy
Unwanted substances that make something unclean, such as dirt

Books and films
Soil (manga), a manga by Atsushi Kaneko
The Soil (film), 1973 Iranian film

Music
Soil Stradivarius, a violin fabricated in 1714 by Antonio Stradivari
Soil (American band), an American metal band
Soil (British band), an indie pop group from Manchester
The Soil (band), South African group
soil (album), debut studio album by Serpentwithfeet
Soil (EP), debut EP of American band Soil
"Soil", a song by System of a Down from their album System of a Down

Other
Sustainable Organic Integrated Livelihoods (SOIL), an American nonprofit developmental aid organization
Soil, an academic journal by EGU
Soils, another academic journal by MDPI